Svensk Hjalmar Zakeus Andersson (13 July 1889 – 2 November 1971) was a Swedish cross-country runner. He competed at the 1912 Summer Olympics held in Stockholm and won an individual silver and team gold medals. The course was rather hilly and approximately 12 km long; it was not made known to competitors before the race.

References

1889 births
1971 deaths
People from Ljusnarsberg Municipality
Swedish male long-distance runners
Olympic athletes of Sweden
Athletes (track and field) at the 1912 Summer Olympics
Olympic gold medalists for Sweden
Olympic silver medalists for Sweden
Medalists at the 1912 Summer Olympics
Olympic gold medalists in athletics (track and field)
Olympic silver medalists in athletics (track and field)
Swedish male cross country runners
Olympic cross country runners
Sportspeople from Örebro County